Wangshi is a town of Jianli County, Jingzhou, in southern Hubei province, China.

Administrative divisions

, Wangshi had 2 residential communities and 23 villages under its administration.

Two residential communities:
Wangshi, Beikou

Twenty-three villages:

See also 
 List of township-level divisions of Hubei

References 

Township-level divisions of Hubei
Jingzhou